Acoustic Planet is a Hungarian band from Békéscsaba, most notable for participating in A Dal 2019 with their song "Nyári zápor".

History 
The formation was based on acoustic basics, and have performed in many concerts and in large festivals. They have performed original songs, mainstream pop songs and processions in their repertoire.

They competed in A Dal 2019, the 2019 edition of the Hungarian national selection for the Eurovision Song Contest 2019, with the song "Nyári zápor". They reached the superfinal.

Members

Current lineup

 Réka Zsombok: vocals 
 Szabolcs Kölcsey: guitar, vocals
 Zsolt Balázs: bass
 István Nagy: drums 
 Tamás Fábián: percussion

Discography

Singles 
 "Egy kicsit..." (2018)
 "Nyári zápor" (2018)
 "Felettünk a mindenség" (2018)

Awards 
 2017: Street Song Competition (Eger): Best Band Title and Audience Award
 2017: Veszprém Street Song Festival:  Audience Award, Special Award

References

External links 
 Acoustic Planet on dalol.hu
 Acoustic Planet's Facebook page
 Acoustic Planet's profile on adal.hu-n
 

People from Békéscsaba
Hungarian pop music groups
Musical groups established in 2015
2015 establishments in Hungary